Justice Hopkins may refer to:

Arthur F. Hopkins, associate justice of the Supreme Court of Alabama
Richard Joseph Hopkins, associate justice of the Kansas Supreme Court
Rufus Hopkins, associate justice of the Rhode Island Supreme Court
Stephen Hopkins (politician), chief justice of the Rhode Island Supreme Court
William Hopkins (Rhode Island), associate justice of the Rhode Island Supreme Court